Alina Alekseevna Somova (born 22 October 1985) is a Russian ballet dancer and principal dancer with the Mariinsky Ballet of Saint Petersburg.

Early life
When Somova was young, she went to a regular Saint Petersburg school and then to a special math school at her mother's insistence. She was not able to excel in sports like her mother wished due to Russia's political and economic transition in the 1990s. Because of this, she was then introduced to ballet at the Dance Krushok school for children where she was recognized for her physical gifts for dancing. After it came time to choose math or ballet, she claimed there was no choice and then admitted herself to a one-year pre-curriculum program at the Vaganova Academy, before embarking on the eight-year course. She was a prize-winner at the Vaganova-Prix International Ballet Competition in St. Petersburg in 2002, and graduated in 2003 under the class of Lyudmila Safronova.

Career
After graduating from the ballet school in 2003 at age 17, she then joined the Mariinsky Ballet under the Artistic Director Makhar Vaziev. During her first year in the company, she was given the unusual honor of dancing Odette/Odile in Swan Lake on 13 May 2003. She was one of the youngest dancers in the company history to attain this kind of recognition. Advancing quickly, she became a soloist in 2004. She began at the Mariinsky Ballet by learning the Swan Lake variations under her teacher at the time, Olga Ivanovna Chenchikova. She was also coached by Tatiana Terekhova who oversaw her rehearsals of George Balanchine's Symphony in C. Somova rapidly climbed the ranks, being promoted to principal in 2008. In 2009, for her performance as the Tsar Maiden in the ballet The Little Humpbacked Horse, Somova received a Golden Mask in the Best Female Role category. Somova still remains as a principal today.

Somova was one of the featured dancers in the 2006 documentary Ballerina.

Repertoire

References

1985 births
Living people
Mariinsky Ballet principal dancers
Prima ballerinas
Russian ballerinas
Recipients of the Golden Mask
Vaganova graduates
21st-century Russian ballet dancers